The Stade Michel-Volnay is a multi-use stadium in Saint-Pierre, Réunion.  It is currently used mostly for football matches and serves as the home stadium for JS Saint-Pierroise.  The stadium holds 8,010 people.

References

Football venues in Réunion
JS Saint-Pierroise